Sewanee Elementary School is a public, coeducational Elementary School in Sewanee, Tennessee that played a significant role during the integration of Tennessee Public Schools in the 1960s.

Description 
Sewanee Elementary School is an elementary school for grades kindergarten through year five and is in the Franklin County, Tennessee school district. It resides within the domain of the University of the South and serves Sewanee and nearby communities. It is housed in a 1926 sandstone main building with red-brick additions made in subsequent years. For each grade, there are typically two classes.

History 

The Sewanee Elementary School was founded in 1926 with the dedication of the present main school building. However, the school traces it antecedents to 1867 when the first public school was built on the mountain by Jabez Wheeler Hayes, an Episcopalian from New Jersey. Along with Hayes’ school, Saint-Paul’s-On-The-Mountain, over time various other area schools were combined into Sewanee Elementary School including the school on Billy Goat Hill, the school for African-American children, and the Sherwood, Tennessee elementary school.

Desegregation 
Since its inception, the school had been segregated and only attended by white children. African-American children attended a separate school nearby. In the early 1960s, members of the Sewanee community begin petitioning Franklin County, Tennessee to integrate the school. In 1964, the County lost an integration suit filed by eight families. This case was significant since it involved both white and African-American plaintiffs.

Tennessee Historical Commission Marker 
To commemorate the desegregation, on January 19, 2014, a Tennessee Historical Commission marker was dedicated at the school.

The text of the marker reads

References

External links 
 http://www.edline.net/pages/Sewanee_Elementary_School

Public elementary schools in Tennessee
Sewanee, Tennessee